Mark Opzoomer was the CEO of Rambler Media from March 2007 till February 2009, having been non-executive director from 16 March 2005. Before joining Rambler, Mark served as the Regional Vice President & Managing Director, YAHOO! Europe from July 2001 to December 2003.

Opzoomer graduated with an MBA from IMD, Lausanne, Switzerland. He qualified as a chartered accountant with PwC in 1981.

He married Rosemary Leith, later a founding director of the World Wide Web Foundation; the couple had three children, after which she left the financial sector, co-founding a start-up during the dot-com bubble.

References

British businesspeople
Canadian businesspeople
Living people
Year of birth missing (living people)
Yahoo! employees